Water distribution may refer to:

 Maritime transport
 Water distribution system of a water supply network